LMRS may refer to:

 Long-Term Mine Reconnaissance System
 Land Mobile Radio Service